Archibald James Butterworth (19 June 1912 – 12 February 2005) was an inventor and racing motorist who, in 1948, designed and constructed the A.J.B. Special, a four-wheel drive Formula One car. He was winner of the Brighton Speed Trials in 1949 and 1951. After a serious accident in 1951, he gave up competition, but continued to supply race car engines of his own design, notably to Bill Aston for the Aston Butterworth Grand Prix car and Archie Scott Brown for the Elva-Butterworth sports racing car.

Early life
Educated at the Mount St Mary's College, attended University College, London, but left to join the army: Irish Guards, then RASC-MT as driving instructor. Posted to special unit in Egypt. Left the Army in 1937 but returned at start of WW2. After Dunkirk he spent the duration of the war, and up to 1950, on armament design, when he established Butterworth Engineering, of Frimley, Surrey. He raced a Bentley 4½ Litre from 1946 and became a member of the BRDC in 1947.

The A.J.B. Special
The A.J.B. Special, dubbed S2, was built for £300 in 1948. The car was powered by a war-surplus air-cooled Steyr V8 engine. Butterworth was inspired by Sydney Allard's Steyr-powered single-seater, which went on to win the British Hill Climb Championship in 1949. The A.J.B. ran on a mixture of: "80/12/8 methanol, benzole, petrol."  The A.J.B. was entered for the hill climb at Stanmer Park, Brighton, Sussex, held on 5 June 1948 but was a non-starter.

Key: FTD = Fastest Time of the Day; non-S/C = Unsupercharged.

At Shelsley Walsh on 22 September 1951: "An unfortunate accident happened to A.J. Butterworth when the A.J.B. hit the bank at Kennel Bend, tore off a rear wheel and left the road. Butterworth was badly hurt." The
Manchester Guardian reported: "A.J. Butterworth, the racing driver, of Frimley, near Aldershot, was injured when his A.J.B. car (4,425 c.c.) crashed down a steep bank at the Midland Automobile Club's hill-climb at Shelsley Walsh Hill in Worcestershire on Saturday. A wheel of his car caught a guttering on the edge of the track and came off. Butterworth was picked up unconscious and was stated at Worcester Royal Infirmary on Saturday night to be in a serious condition. Motor Sport published a photograph of Butterworth in the #79 A.J.B. leaving the road at Shelsley Walsh. He recovered from his injuries.

The 'Butterball Special'

Bill Milliken visited Prescott Hill Climb in England in 1951, where he saw the A.J.B. in competition. An offer to purchase the car was declined, but subsequently accepted following Archie Butterworth's accident at Shelsley Walsh. The remains of the A.J.B. were exported to the U.S.A. early in 1952, rebuilt and renamed the Butterball Special, a play on Butterworth's name. The rebuild was carried out in Buffalo, New York: "It has since been extensively redesigned with longer wheelbase, new rear suspension, improved steering, brakes, chassis and body. This work was performed in the Flight Research and Vehicle Dynamics Department of Cornell Aeronautical Laboratory under the direction of William Close." The car was then driven in competition by Bill Milliken:

Key: FTD = Fastest Time of the Day.

In autumn 1957 the car was shipped to the Four Wheel Drive Company Museum in Clintonville, Wisconsin. The car was still there in 2010 (see photograph).

Aston Butterworth

For 1952 Butterworth teamed up with Bill Aston to build the Aston Butterworth, an F2 car that competed in Grand Prix races, but was unreliable. Butterworth built the 1,986 c.c. air-cooled, flat-four-cylinder motors.

Kieft Butterworth

At the 1954 Motor Show in London Kieft Cars displayed a motor described by Bill Boddy as: "the Kieft/Norton air-cooled flat-four 1½-litre which gives over 100 b.h.p."  This was a version of the Butterworth motor fitted with Norton cylinder heads. Ian Richardson successfully used this engine during the 1970s in the Moonraker drag racing motorcycle.

Elva Butterworth
Archie Scott Brown drove the Elva-Butterworth Mk III sports-racing car in a support race at the Silverstone International Trophy meeting in 1957 where: "The Elva-Butterworth retired with a broken valve-Butterworth will have difficulty living this down but, in fact, it was an exhaust valve and not a Butterworth flap valve which dropped."

Tojeiro Butterworth
The Tojeiro-Butterworth sports-racing car was built by R.C.C Palmer over a period of more than three years to 1960. Although built as a race car, it was never raced.  Only one example was produced.   "Mr. Palmer was especially keen to get the cooling right as he felt that inefficient cooling was part of the trouble with the Elva-Butterworth which Archie Scott-Brown (sic) drove on several occasions." The car was road registered XNK 900.

Later life
Following the death of his friend Archie Scott Brown in 1958, Archie Butterworth was less involved in motor racing. He was instrumental in founding the British Sporting Rifle Club in 1962.

References

Footnotes

Bibliography
 John Bolster, Specials, Pages 31–33, G.T. Foulis & Co Ltd, Reprinted 1971.

British hillclimb drivers
Brighton Speed Trials people
Formula One people
1912 births
2005 deaths
People educated at Mount St Mary's College